Lüneburg Water Tower is a water tower in the southeastern part of the Lüneburg old town in Lower Saxony, Germany, built by the architect Franz Krüger (1873–1936), from designs by Richard Kampf. Its erection was initiated on 3 October 1905, and the tower was taken into use in November 1907.
It stands between the considerably newer Nordlandhalle (which has been demolished meanwhile) and the Johanneum, the latter now used as a school. The upper part is carried by 16 solid columns.

The tower was in operation until summer 1986. It was planned to demolish it, but this was cancelled because of too high costs, and later the tower was declared a cultural heritage monument. Starting 1997 it was renovated for the EXPO 2000, and today it is in use as Scenic viewpoint.

References

External links 

Towers completed in 1907
Water towers in Germany
Buildings and structures in Lüneburg (district)